The William Williams House is a historic house in Lebanon, Connecticut, at the junction of Connecticut Routes 87 and 207.  A National Historic Landmark, it is significant as the residence, from 1755 until his death, of Founding Father William Williams (1731–1811), who was a delegate from Connecticut to the Continental Congress and a signer of the U.S. Declaration of Independence.  It is a well-preserved and little-altered colonial-era house.

Description and history
The Williams house is a -story wood-frame structure, five bays wide and two deep, with a side-gable roof, twin interior chimneys, and clapboard siding.  Its main entrance, centered on the front facade has a Greek Revival surround, with sidelight windows and pilasters flanking the door, topped by a cornice with a carved elliptical arch.  A single-story ell extends to the rear of the house.  The interior follows a center hall plan, and retains original features, including fireplace mantels (although most of the fireplaces have been closed up), and wide pine flooring.

The house's construction date and original owner are not known.  It was purchased in 1748 by Reverend Solomon Williams, who gave it to his son William in 1755.  William (born 1731) was trained at Harvard College, and saw provincial militia duty in the French and Indian War in 1755.  He settled in Lebanon that year, and embarked on career as a merchant, jurist, and politician.  He served in the provincial assembly 1757-1776 and the state legislature 1781–1784.  He was a steadfast supporter of independence during the American Revolution, working closely with his father-in-law, Lebanon native and Governor of Connecticut Jonathan Trumbull.  Williams personally funded Connecticut militia that captured Fort Ticonderoga in 1775.  He was elected to the Second Continental Congress, where he signed the United States Declaration of Independence and the Articles of Confederation.  He was a delegate to the 1788 state convention that ratified the United States Constitution.

Williams' house was also directly involved in the war effort during the revolution.  In the winter of 1780–81, the French cavalry forces of Lauzun's Legion were stationed in Lebanon.  Williams' house was allotted to Lauzun's second-in-command, Robert Dillon, during this time.

The house was declared a National Historic Landmark and listed on the National Register of Historic Places in 1971.

See also

List of National Historic Landmarks in Connecticut
March Route of Rochambeau's army
List of historic sites preserved along Rochambeau's route
National Register of Historic Places listings in New London County, Connecticut

References

National Historic Landmarks in Connecticut
Houses in Lebanon, Connecticut
Houses on the National Register of Historic Places in Connecticut
Historic places on the Washington–Rochambeau Revolutionary Route
National Register of Historic Places in New London County, Connecticut
Homes of United States Founding Fathers